Sivagiri is a panchayat town in Erode district in the Indian state of Tamil Nadu.

Sivagiri means "Shiva's peak", also called as Kanagagiri, which might have been derived from the hill with a Shiva temple located in the town.

Demographics 
 India census, Sivagiri had a population of 35,285. Males constituted 51% of the population and females 49%. Sivagiri has an average literacy rate of 70%, higher than the national average of 59.5%: male literacy is 75%, and female literacy is 65%. In Sivagiri, 9% of the population is under 6 years of age.

Economy
The economy of the town is dependent on the agriculture and textile industries (mostly handlooms).

Culture
During Tamil month Masi Magam (Feb-Mar) is an auspicious day for celebrating Pongal festival to Arulmigu Kamatchi Amman, Sivagiri. Devotees would take Cauvery Theertham for Abhishekam. Later evening, devotees would bring Pongal a banana to give it to Amman. This is one of the huge festivals occurring every year in February – March.
 
Generally, in the month of April, a large Ratha Yatra festival is celebrated in Velayudha Swami temple every year.

Transport 

Sivagiri is connected by two state highways passing through the town:
 SH84A connecting Erode – Modakurichi - Vellakoil – Mulanur.
 The Arachalur- Thamaraipalayam- Kodumudi road passes through the town.

Sivagiri is connected with Erode and Karur, the neighboring towns by local transports.
The town has one bus stand. It has frequent bus services to Erode, Muthur, Vellakovil, Arachalur, Kodumudi and Chennimalai.

Education
The Bharathiyar University College of Arts and Science is located here, run by the Government of Tamil Nadu. It has the SSV Matriculation Higher Secondary School and government schools for both boys (Sivagiri) and girls (Ammankovil).

References

Cities and towns in Erode district